The 2018 Trofeo de España TCR is the third season of the TCR Spanish Series. The championship will run as the one of classes of the Campeonato de España Resistencia.

Teams and drivers

Calendar and results

Championship standings

Scoring system

Drivers' championship

† – Drivers did not finish the race, but were classified as they completed over 75% of the race distance.

References

External links
 

Trofeo de Espana TCR
Campeonato de Espana de Resistencia